Caecilia bokermanni is a species of caecilian in the family Caeciliidae. It is found in Colombia, Ecuador, and possibly Peru. Its natural habitat is subtropical or tropical moist lowland forests.

References

bokermanni
Amphibians of Colombia
Amphibians of Ecuador
Taxa named by Edward Harrison Taylor
Amphibians described in 1968
Taxonomy articles created by Polbot